Day of Darkness was the original name of Ireland's D.O.D. Festival. It happened annually in Ballylinan from 2002 to 2008 as a metal music festival.

The 2002 line-up was headlined by Primordial. It ran for a second year in 2003. Numbers, however, dwindled that year and a number of changes were implemented before the festival's third running in 2004. In 2005, the festival was moved to the first week in July and has been held on the same weekend each year since. In 2006, a second day was added to the festival and camping tickets were introduced.

The festival discontinued in 2008.

Past line-ups

2008
Friday Line-Up
 
 Watain
 Nifelheim
 Stand-Up Guy
 Old Season
 Neocosmic
 Sirocco
 Victim X
 Visceral Attack

Saturday Line-Up

 Doomsword
 Mourning Beloveth
 Celtic Legacy
 Thy Sinister Bloom
 Chambercraft
 Graveyard Dirt
 Overoth
 Darkest Era
 Nephridium
 Unleashed

2007
Saturday Line-Up

 Entombed
 Sabbat
 Abaddon Incarnate
 Cruachan
 Conquest of Steel
 The Prophecy
 Spearhead
 Hatred
 Era Vulgaris

Friday Line-Up

 Candlemass
 Skyforger
 Mael Mórdha
 Gorilla Monsoon
 Putrefy
 The Swarm
 Warpath
 Hallowed

2006
Saturday Line-Up

 Destruction
 Primordial
 Morphosis
 Hexxed
 Mass Extinction
 Aftermath
 Primed
 For Ruin
 A Distant Sun
 Nothing is Sacred

Friday Line-Up

Moonsorrow
 Geasa
 Sorrowfall
 Ground of Ruin
 Minds Astray

2005
 Rotting Christ
 Desaster
 Mourning Beloveth
 Scavenger
 Waylander
 Carnún Rising
 Primal Dawn
 devilmakesthree
 Wreck of the Hesperus (band)
 Ground of Ruin

Eve of Darkness Warm-up Show

 Steel Tormentor
 Primed
 Slave Zero
 Skoll

2004
 Dismember
 Ancient Rites
 Abaddon Incarnate
 Mael Mórdha
 Putrefy
 The Swarm
 Old Season
 Sinister Demise
 Sol Axis
 Mabus
 Demize

+ Special tribute to Bathory featuring members from Primordial, Sol Axis, Geasa, and Kingdom

2003
 Mourning Beloveth
 Mael Mórdha
 Honey for Christ
 Waylander
 Die Laughing
 Scavenger
 Carnún Rising
 Old Season
 Inhumane
 The Swarm

2002
 Primordial
 Mourning Beloveth
 Primal Dawn
 Geasa
 Condemned
 Bloodbox
 Coldwar
 Corrupted (IRL)
 Slave Zero
 The 8th Day
 Die Laughing

References

External links
 

2000s in Irish music
Heavy metal festivals in Ireland
Music festivals in Ireland
Music in County Laois
2002 establishments in Ireland
Music festivals established in 2002
Defunct music festivals